Christine Lawrence Finney (April 1, 1968 – January 5, 2016) was an American animator and painter.

Life 
Born in Painesville, Ohio, Finney began working at Walt Disney Pictures in the 1980s.

She worked on numerous films, specializing in character animation, during the Disney Renaissance, including The Rescuers Down Under (1990), Beauty and the Beast (1991), Aladdin (1992), The Lion King (1994), Pocahontas (1995), Mulan (1998), Lilo & Stitch (2002), and Brother Bear (2003). Finney, with her husband, moved to Spartanburg, South Carolina, spending her time painting regionally.

Finney died on January 5, 2016, in Spartanburg, aged 47.

Filmography

References

External links 

1968 births
2016 deaths
American animators
20th-century American painters
American women painters
American women animators
21st-century American painters
20th-century American women
21st-century American women